Bernard Bureau (born 25 January 1959) is a French former professional footballer who played as a forward.

Club career 
Bureau is a youth graduate of AS Chelles. At age 19, a couple of months before joining Paris Saint-Germain in 1978, he was preparing for a culinary arts  (CAP). In three seasons with PSG, he would make a total of 46 appearances and score 11 goals in all competitions. He continued his career at Brest, Lille, Matra Racing, Nancy, and Reims. At the end of his career, Bureau had made 304 league appearances and scored 64 goals, playing 10 of his 13 professional seasons in the Division 1, and the other 3 in the Division 2.

International career 
From 1983 to 1984, Bureau played for the France Olympic team. He would make a total of three appearances.

Style of play 
Bureau was described as a "racy" forward. He was an excellent header of the ball.

After football 
In 1991, Bureau retired from football; he subsequently went to live in the area of Nantes. He started a car cleaning company, and invested his capital in a night club called "Le Quai West". However, he would go back to one of his former passions, catering, in a restaurant in Nantes called “Aux délices de la pomme de terre”, before investing in real estate and apartment renovation in the Loire-Atlantique.

Honours 
Nancy
 Division 2: 1989–90

Notes

References

External links 

1959 births
Living people
Sportspeople from Oise
French footballers
Association football forwards
Olympic footballers of France
Paris Saint-Germain F.C. players
Stade Brestois 29 players
Lille OSC players
Racing Club de France Football players
AS Nancy Lorraine players
Stade de Reims players
Ligue 1 players
Ligue 2 players
Footballers from Hauts-de-France